Luís Fernando Rodrigues dos Santos (born 21 December 1983 in Santana do Livramento, Rio Grande do Sul), known as his given name Luís Fernando or Luizao, is a Brazilian footballer.

Football career

South America
He started his professional career at Bella Vista of Primera División Uruguaya. He then moved to Deportes Concepción of Liga Chilena de Fútbol: Primera B, before back to Brazil for Guarani of Campeonato Brasileiro Série B.

Switzerland
He signed by Swiss 2. Liga interregional (4th division) club FC Ascona on 31 August 2005, just few days he was signed by Grêmio Esportivo Glória.

He scored 14 goals in 9 games, and AC Lugano of Swiss Challenge League, signed him on 22 January 2006.

On 25 September 2007, he moved to SC Kriens.

References

External links

 Brazilian FA Database

1983 births
Living people
Sportspeople from Rio Grande do Sul
Brazilian footballers
Brazilian expatriate footballers
C.A. Bella Vista players
Deportes Concepción (Chile) footballers
Guarani FC players
FC Lugano players
SC Kriens players
Uruguayan Primera División players
Primera B de Chile players
Brazilian expatriate sportspeople in Uruguay
Brazilian expatriate sportspeople in Chile
Brazilian expatriate sportspeople in Switzerland
Brazilian expatriate sportspeople in Iran
Expatriate footballers in Uruguay
Expatriate footballers in Chile
Expatriate footballers in Switzerland
Expatriate footballers in Iran
Association football forwards